Reynard the Fox is a literary cycle of medieval allegorical Dutch, English, French and German fables. The first extant versions of the cycle date from the second half of the 12th century. The genre was popular throughout the Late Middle Ages, as well as in chapbook form throughout the Early Modern period.

The stories are largely concerned with the main character Reynard, an anthropomorphic red fox, trickster figure. His adventures usually involve his deceiving other anthropomorphic animals for his own advantage or trying to avoid their retaliatory efforts. His main enemy and victim across the cycle is his uncle, the wolf, Isengrim (or Ysengrim).

While the character of Reynard appears in later works, the core stories were written during the Middle Ages by multiple authors and are often seen as parodies of medieval literature such as courtly love stories and chansons de geste, as well as a satire of political and religious institutions. The trickster fox, Reynard, lives in a society of other talking animals (lion, bear, wolf, donkey, et cetera), making the stories a beast epic.

The original copies were written in Old French, but have since been translated into many different languages. However, the tales of Reynard come from all across Europe and each retelling has details that are specific to that area. The tales, no matter where they take place, are designed to represent the society around them and include the structures of society around them such as a noble court. While the authors take many liberties with the story telling, not all of the satire is meant to be rude or malicious in intent.

Characters

The main characters are anthropomorphic animals. The given names of the animals are of Old High German origin; most of them were in common use as personal names in medieval Lorraine. The characters of Reynard the Fox were based on the medieval hierarchy, and are treated as human throughout the tales. Though, since multiple authors wrote the text, characters' personalities often change. Throughout the stories, these characters often switch between human and animal form and often without notice. The characters who switch between human and animal form are often those of elite status, while the characters who don't change tend to be peasants. Often, the readers will find themselves able to empathize with Reynard. They find that the situations he is in are not often that different from their own lives, and this carries across the decades. The most common usage of animals as characters in tales has made it so the stories that touch on morally gray areas are easier to understand and accept.

Reynard the Fox. 
The given name Reynard is from Reginhard, Raginohardus "strong in counsel". Because of the popularity of the Reynard stories, renard became the standard French word for "fox", replacing the old French word for "fox", which was goupil from Latin vulpēcula. Since Reynard has been written about in many different times and places across the world, it is not uncommon to see changes in his appearance to fit the natural surroundings of his story. His fur is often used as a camouflage, meaning if the story was written in a snowy landscape he will have white fur, or yellow fur for desert areas, in the wooded areas of forest he is depicted in red.
Isengrim the Wolf, see Ysengrimus
Tibert the Cat; see Tybalt, Prince of cats
King Noble the Lion; see king of beasts
Bruin the Bear
Grimbard the Badger
Baldwin the Ass 
Hirsent the She-wolf
Kyward the Hare (also Coart, Cuwaert; a coward)
Chanticleer the Cock
Bellin the Ram
Martin the Ape, who had a son named Moneke that may be source of the word monkey

In medieval European folklore and literature

Foxes in general have the reputation of tricksters in traditional European folklore.
The specific character of Reynard is thought to have originated in Lorraine folklore, from where it spread to France, Germany, and the Low Countries. Alternatively, a 19th-century edition of a retelling of the Reynard fable states definitively with "no doubt whatever that it is of German origin" and relates a conjecture associating the central character with "a certain Reinard of Lorraine, famous for his vulpine qualities in the ninth century".
Joseph Jacobs, while seeing an origin in Lorraine, traces classical, German, and "ancient northern folk-lore" elements within the Reynard stories.
Jacob Grimm in his Reinhart Fuchs (Berlin, 1834) provided evidence for the supposition on etymological grounds that "stories of the Fox and Wolf were known to the Franks as early as the fourth, fifth, and sixth centuries".

From the twelfth and thirteenth centuries there are around twenty-six different tales of Reynard the Fox. While there might have been more that were written these are the ones that survive to present day. Many of these are written by different authors and anonymous authors, so there was not just one person writing the tales. An extensive treatment of the character is the Old French Le Roman de Renart written by Pierre de Saint-Cloud around 1170, which sets the typical setting. Reynard has been summoned to the court of king Noble (or Leo), the lion, to answer charges brought against him by Isengrim the wolf. Other anthropomorphic animals, including Bruin the bear, Baldwin the ass, and Tibert (Tybalt) the cat, all attempt one stratagem or another. The stories typically involve satire whose usual butts are the aristocracy and the clergy, making Reynard a peasant-hero character. The Catholic Church used the story of the preaching fox (as found in the Reynard literature) in church art as propaganda against the Lollards. Reynard's principal castle, Maupertuis, is available to him whenever he needs to hide away from his enemies. Some of the tales feature Reynard's funeral, where his enemies gather to deliver maudlin elegies full of insincere piety, and which feature Reynard's posthumous revenge. Reynard's wife Hermeline appears in the stories, but plays little active role, although in some versions she remarries when Reynard is thought dead, thereby becoming one of the people he plans revenge upon. Isengrim (alternate French spelling: Ysengrin) is Reynard's most frequent antagonist and foil, and generally ends up outwitted, though he occasionally gets revenge.

An individual tale might span several genres which makes classification difficult. Tales often include themes from contemporary society with references to relics, pilgrimage, confession, and the crusades. There is debate over whether or how closely they related to identifiable societal events, but there is a growing camp that see direct societal connections and even implicit political statements in the tales. The stories are told in a way that make such associations easy to make but difficult to substantiate.

Reynard stories translate difficult laws and legal concepts into common language, allowing people to both understand them and enjoy the legal predicaments and antics of the characters. The court operates just as those in medieval society; the king heard cases only on one specified date and all disputes were heard at once.

Many versions follow Reynard's fights with Yesengrin, the fox's regular antagonist throughout the stories. Violence between them and other characters is a common thematic element. It is a matter of debate whether the violence shows animals simply acting as such or is meant to reflect the violence in society, especially the various wars that common folk endured at the time.

Ysengrimus
Reynard appears first in the medieval Latin poem Ysengrimus, a long Latin mock-epic written c. 1148–53 by the medieval poet Nivardus, that collects a great store of Reynard's adventures. He also puts in an early appearance in a number of Latin sequences by the early-13th-century preacher Odo of Cheriton. Both of these early sources seem to draw on a pre-existing store of popular culture featuring the character.

Roman de Renart 
The first "branch" (or chapter) of the Roman de Renart appears in 1174, written by Pierre de St. Cloud, although in all French editions it is designated as "Branch II". The same author wrote a sequel in 1179—called "Branch I"—but from that date onwards, many other French authors composed their own adventures for Renart li goupil ("the fox"). There is also the Middle High German text Reinhard Fuchs by Heinrich der Glïchezäre, dated to  1180. Roman de Renart which fits into the genre of romance. Roman de Renart gets its start using the history of fables that have been written since the time of Aesop. The romance genre of the middle ages is not what we think of the romance genre of today; it was a fiction telling of a character's life. The protagonist of the romance genre often has an adventure or a call to action, almost always caused by an outside force. During the 13th century, French was a standard literary language, and many works during the Middle Ages were written in French, including Reynard the Fox. Many popular works from the Middle Ages fall into the romance genre.

Pierre de St. Cloud opens his work on the fox by situating it within the larger tradition of epic poetry, the fabliaux and Arthurian romance:

Van den vos Reynaerde

A mid-13th-century Middle Dutch version of the story by Willem die Madoc maecte (Van den vos Reynaerde, Of Reynaert the Fox), is also made up of rhymed verses (the same AA BB scheme). Van den vos Reinaerde and Reinaert Historie (referred to as R I and R II, respectively) are two poems written by two different authors with R II being a continuation of R I. With different writers comes different variations. This can best be seen with Reynard himself. While describing the same character the Reynard from R I has many different character traits of that in R II. While a finished and completed poem by itself, Van den vos Reinaerde does not have a set ending.

Like Pierre, very little is known of the author, other than the description by the copyist in the first sentences:

Madocke or Madoc is thought to be another one of Willem's works that at one point existed but had been lost. The Arnout mentioned was an earlier Reynard poet whose work Willem (the writer) alleges to have finished. However, there are serious objections to this notion of joint authorship, and the only thing deemed likely is that Arnout was French-speaking ("Walschen" in Middle Dutch referred to northern French-speaking people, specifically the Walloons). Willem's work became one of the standard versions of the legend, and was the foundation for most later adaptations in Dutch, German, and English, including those of William Caxton, Goethe, and F. S. Ellis.

Chaucer
Geoffrey Chaucer used Reynard material in the Canterbury Tales; in "The Nun's Priest's Tale", Reynard appears as "Rossel" and an ass as "Brunel".

Early Modern tradition

In 1481, the English William Caxton printed The Historie of Reynart the Foxe, which was translated from Van den vos Reynaerde. Also in the 1480s, the Scottish poet Robert Henryson devised a highly sophisticated development of Reynardian material as part of his Morall Fabillis in the sections known as The Talking of the Tod. Hans van Ghetelen, a printer of Incunabula in Lübeck printed a Low German version called Reinke de Vos in 1498. It was translated to Latin and other languages, which made the tale popular across Europe. Reynard is also referenced in the Middle English poem Sir Gawain and the Green Knight during the third hunt.

Tybalt in Shakespeare's Romeo and Juliet is named after the cat in Reynard the Fox (and is called 'Prince of Cats' by Mercutio in reference to this).
Jonson's play Volpone is heavily indebted to Reynard.

With the invention of the printing press the tales of Reynard the fox became more popular and started to be translated and recreated in many different languages. The tales of Reynard don't follow the typical sense of reprinting, as there is no clear chronology to the stories. Many of the original pages to these stories have been lost, so it is difficult to tell what the exact literary changes are, of which there aren't many, with the exception of the typical changes that are seen from the early days of the printing press. There are also slight changes to the wording that show modernization of the uses and differing orders of the words. While the changes might appear to be mistakes, they are not thought of as such and are often kept in the modernization of the tales. There haven't been many attempts to better the works in during the fifteenth and sixteenth centuries. Changes to the tales during the fifteenth century are not seen as mistakes because of specific roles in the process of printing designed to eliminate mistakes. In the early modern editions of Reynard the Fox, the characteristics of the animals were based on literary topoi appealing to the middle class reader.

Modern treatment

19th century 
Reinecke Fuchs by Goethe is a poem in hexameters, in twelve parts, written 1793 and first published 1794.
Goethe adapted the Reynard material from the edition by Johann Christoph Gottsched (1752), based on the 1498 Reynke de vos.

In Friedrich Nietzsche's 1889 The Twilight of the Idols, Nietzsche uses Reynard the Fox as an example of a dialectician.

German artist Johann Heinrich Ramberg made a series of thirty drawings, which he also etched and published in 1825.

Renert [full original title: Renert oder de Fuuß am Frack an a Ma'nsgrëßt], was published in 1872 by Michel Rodange, a Luxembourgeois author. An epic satirical work—adapted from the 1858 Cotta Edition of Goethe's fox epic Reineke Fuchs to a setting in Luxembourg. It is known to be a satirical mirror image of Luxembourg's social sphere after the turmoils of the Luxembourg Crisis, whereby the author transposed his criticism and social scepticism to the animal society in which his fox 'Renert' lives. Beyond that, it is insightful analysis of the different regional and sub-regional linguistic differences of the country, where distinct dialects are used to depict the fox and his companions.

20th- and 21st-century literature

Fedor Flinzer illustrated Reineke Fuchs (Reynard the Fox) for children.

French artist Rémy Lejeune (Ladoré) illustrated Les Aventures de Maître Renart et d'Ysengrin son compère, "Bibliolâtres de France" editions (1960).

 British poet laureate John Masefield's poem "Reynard the Fox" (1920) concerns a fox hunt that pursues the title character, who "could outlast horse and outrace hound."
 Louis Paul Boon's novel Wapenbroeders (Brothers in Arms, 1955) is an extensive reworking of the whole tale.
 Reynard the Fox makes a short but significant appearance at the end of The Magician King, when he is accidentally summoned.
 Reynard, a genetically modified part-fox, is a major character in John Crowley's novel Beasts.
 Reynard, in a variety of lives and names often containing "Guy," "Fox," "Fawkes," and "Reynard," is one of the leading characters in the Book of All Hours Duology by Hal Duncan, and is stated to be every incarnation of the trickster throughout the multiverse.
 A human version of the character appears in David R. Witanowski's Reynard Cycle novels.
 The fantasy detective Peter Grant crosses paths with Reynard in the novel The Hanging Tree by Ben Aaronovitch.
A version of the character appears in Laurence Yep's A Dragon's Guide series as a shapeshifting, computer-hacking ally of the dragon Ms. Drake.
In 2020, the Bodleian Library published a major retelling of the Flemish Reynard the Fox by Anne Louise Avery. See the Times Literary Supplement review here: Reynard the Fox by Anne Louise Avery; Aesop's Fables review and Dutch Crossing: Journal of Low Countries Studies here The Once and Future Fox: Reynard the Fox. Avery's retelling was chosen by Irish designer Paul Costelloe as his favourite book on Desert Island Discs. 
 Swedish children's comic Bamse added a reoccurring trickster antagonist named Reinard Räv (Reinard Fox) with a rivalry with Vargen (The Wolf) in 2006

Dutch antisemitic version (1937)
Van den vos Reynaerde (Of Reynaert the Fox) was an antisemitic children's story, written by the Belgian-born Dutch politician Robert van Genechten, and named after the Middle Dutch poem. It was first published in 1937 in Nieuw-Nederland, a monthly publication of the Dutch Nazi Party's front, the NSB. In 1941, it was published as a book. The story features a rhinoceros called Jodocus, somewhat akin to the Dutch word jood (which means "Jew"); and a donkey, Boudewijn, who occupies the throne. Boudewijn was the Dutch name for the contemporary real-world Belgian crown prince. In the story, Jodocus is an outsider who comes to the Empire and subsequently introduces new ideas that drastically alter the natural order. The land is then declared a "Republic", where "liberty, equality and fraternity" are to be exercised, presenting a dystopian view of a socialist republic: "There was no one who kept to the rules of the race. Rabbits crept into foxholes, the chickens wanted to build an eyrie." Eventually, Reynard and the others trick and kill Jodocus and his colleagues.

Van den vos Reynaerde was also produced as a cartoon film by Nederlandfilm in 1943, mostly financed with German money. While lavishly budgeted, it was never presented publicly, possibly because most Dutch Jews had already been transported to the concentration camps and the film came too late to be useful as a propaganda piece, possibly also because the Dutch collaborationist Department of People's Information, Service and Arts objected to the fact that the fox, an animal traditionally seen as "villainous", should be used as a hero. In 1991, parts of the film were discovered in the German Bundesarchiv. In 2005, more pieces were found, and the film has been restored. The reconstructed film was shown during the 2006 Holland Animation Film Festival in Utrecht and during the KLIK! Amsterdam Animation Festival in 2008, in the Netherlands.

In films and television

Ladislas Starevich's 1930 puppet-animated feature film Le Roman de Renard (The Tale of the Fox) featured the Reynard character as the protagonist.
The documentary film Black Fox (1962) parallels Hitler's rise to power with the Reynard fable.

Initially, Walt Disney Animation Studios considered a movie about Reynard. However, due to Walt Disney's concern that Reynard was an unsuitable choice for a hero, the studio decided to make Reynard the antagonist of a feature film based on Edmond Rostand's Chanticleer) but the production was scrapped in the mid-1960s, in favor of The Sword in the Stone (1963). Ken Anderson used the character designs for Robin Hood (1973), such as the animal counterparts (e.g. Robin Hood, like Reynard, is a fox while the Sheriff of Nottingham, like Isengrim, is a wolf).

In 1985, a French animated series,  (I Reynard), was created that was loosely based on Reynard's tales. In it, the original animals are anthropomorphic humanoid animals (to the point that, primary, only their heads are that of animals) and the action occurs in modern Paris with other anthropomorphic animals in human roles. Reynard is a young mischievous fox with a little monkey pet called Marmouset (an original creation). He sets off into Paris in order to discover the city, get a job and visit his grumpy and stingy uncle, Isengrim, who is a deluxe car salesman, and his reasonable yet dreamy she-wolf aunt, Hersent. Reynard meets Hermeline, a young and charming motorbike-riding vixen journalist. He immediately falls in love with her and tries to win her heart during several of the episodes. As Reynard establishes himself in Paris, he creates a small company that shares his name which offers to do any job for anyone, from impersonating female maids to opera singers. To help with this, he is a master of disguise and is a bit of a kleptomaniac, which gets him into trouble from police chief Chantecler (a rooster) who often sends cat police inspector Tybalt after him to thwart his plans.

The Goethe fox epic was adapted into a 1989 German television film produced by Manfred Durniok and ZDF called Isegrim ind Reineke; animation was outsourced to Shanghai Animation Film Studio in China. Unlike other versions, this portrays Renart (Reineke) as quite villainous while Isegrim (who is not related in this version) just tries to keep his job safe from the fox's tricks. While Reineke always tricks and beats the wolf, usually some twist of fate or accident still prevents him from winning and keeps Isegrim's job safe in the court. The movie, which is actually 6 episodes of unrelated stories strung together, is available on DVD.

Le roman de Renart is a 2005 CGI feature animated film made in Luxembourg in French with an English dub called Renart The Fox or The Adventures of Renny the Fox.

The TV show The Magicians includes a character who takes the name of Reynard, but bears no resemblance to the historical literary figure. In this version, he is a pagan trickster god who is a son of Persephone.

In music
Reynard the Fox is the name of a number of traditional folk songs (Roud 190, 358 and 1868).
 Renard is a one-act chamber opera-ballet by Igor Stravinsky, written in 1916, with text by the composer based on Russian folk tales from the collection by Alexander Afanasyev.
 Andy Irvine recorded the traditional Irish song "Reynard The Fox" with Sweeney's Men on their 1968 debut album Sweeney's Men.
 Fairport Convention recorded the traditional English song called "Reynard The Fox" (Roud 190) (collected by Ralph Vaughan Williams in Norfolk) on their 1978 album Tipplers Tales.
 Martin Carthy recorded the song "Reynard the Fox" (Roud 1868) on his 1982 album Out of the Cut.
 Julian Cope wrote a song called "Reynard the Fox" which he recorded on his 1984 album Fried.
 Brass Monkey recorded a version of the song collected by Ralph Vaughan Williams as "The Foxhunt" (Roud 190) sung by Martin Carthy on their 1986 album See How It Runs.
 Country Teasers wrote a song called "Reynard the Fox", which appears on the 1999 album Destroy All Human Life.

Other references

Dutch modern artist Leonard van Munster made an installation titled "The Surrender of Reynard the Fox".
Reynard and Reynardine are the basis for a major character in the webcomic Gunnerkrigg Court, a fox demon who can possess "anything with eyes", including living beings and, in his current form, a plush wolf toy. The comic also features Ysengrin, as well as the North American mythological Coyote.
Reynard is portrayed as a character in Fables, as a smart and cunning fox who is loyal to Snow White and Fabletown, despite being one of the Fables segregated to the upstate New York "Farm" due to his non-human appearance. He initially appears as a physically normal fox, anthropomorphized only in his ability to think and speak as humans do; later, he is granted the ability to assume a handsome human appearance.
The French comic De cape et de crocs takes place in an alternative 17th century where anthropomorphic animals live among humans. One of the two main characters, Armand Raynal de Maupertuis, is a French fox based on Reynard. His companion, Don Lope de Villalobos y Sangrin, is a Spanish wolf based on Isengrim (which is spelled Ysengrin in French).
Reynard the Fox appears as an enemy in the Japanese mobile game The Battle Cats as "Raynard".
Sacred Mischief is a contemporary religious and spiritual center that encourages people to embrace the Holy Trickster. The logo is a fox surrounded by fire and is inspired by michevious characters such as Reynard from European folklore.

See also
 Animal tale
 Coyote (mythology)
 Fabliau
 Fox spirit
 Foxes in popular culture, films and literature
 Kitsune
 Króka-Refs saga
 Maleperduis
 Medieval literature
 Trickster
 Ysengrimus

Notes

Bibliography
 Bonafin, Massimo, Le malizie della volpe: Parola letteraria e motivi etnici nel Roman de Renart (Rome: Carocci editore, 2006) (Biblioteca Medievale Saggi). cf. here an abstract of this book & cf. here a review of this book unfortunately not yet translated in English.
 Zebracki, Martin, Het grenzeloze land van Reynaerde [The boundless country of [the Fox] Reynaert]. Geografie 20 (2011: 2), pp. 30–33.
 Johann Heinrich Ramberg (artist), Dietrich Wilhelm Soltau (author), Waltraud Maierhofer (editor): "Reineke Fuchs – Reynard the Fox. 31 Originalzeichnungen u. neu kolorierte Radierungen m. Auszügen aus d. deutschen Übersetzung des Epos im populären Stil v. Soltau | 31 original drawings and newly colored etchings with excerpts from the English translation of the burlesque poem by Soltau." VDG Weimar, Weimar 2016. .

External links

 Le roman de Renart In French.
 The History of Reynard The Fox by Henry Morley, 1889. 
 Full text of the Middle Dutch poem
 Full text of the Middle Dutch poem with notes
 Reinardus, the journal for the International Reynard Society.
 Anne Lair, "The History of Reynard the Fox: How Medieval Literature Reflects Culture," in: Falling into Medievalism, ed. Anne Lair and Richard Utz. Special Issue of UNIversitas: The University of Northern Iowa Journal of Research, Scholarship, and Creative Activity, 2.1 (2006).
 Complete Bibliography on Reynard from the Archives de littérature du Moyen Age
 Reynard The Fox in the Vondelpark 05 03 2010
 Reynard the Fox Collection at Mitchell Library, Glasgow

1872 books
Belgian folklore
Dutch folklore
French folklore
French mythology
French legendary creatures
German folklore
Medieval legends
Medieval literature
Medieval French literature
 
Fables
Mock-heroic poems
Literature featuring anthropomorphic foxes
Fictional tricksters
Fictional con artists
Fictional apes
Fictional badgers
Bears in literature
Cats in literature
Fictional chickens
Fictional donkeys
Lions in literature
Rabbits and hares in literature
Fictional sheep
Wolves in literature
Anthropomorphic animals
Male characters in literature
Male literary villains
Comedy literature characters
Humor and wit characters
Works about royalty
Works set in castles
Forests in fiction